Similiyanornis (meaning "similar to Yanornis") is an extinct genus of ornithuromorphs from the Early Cretaceous Jiufotang Formation of China. The genus contains a single species, Similiyanornis brevipectus, known from a complete skeleton with feathers.

References 

Prehistoric euornitheans
Early Cretaceous birds of Asia
Jiufotang fauna
Fossil taxa described in 2020
Birds described in 2020